"All Eyez" is a song by American rapper The Game featuring Jeremih. It may also refer to:

 All Eyez on Me, a 1996 double album by 2Pac

 All Eyez on Me (Monica album), a 2002 studio album by Monica
 "All Eyez on Me" (song), a title track
 All Eyez on Me (film), an upcoming biographical film about Tupac

See also
All Eyes (disambiguation)
All Eyes on Me (disambiguation)